Carved in Stone  may refer to:
Carved in Stone (Rage album)
Carved in Stone (Shadow Gallery album)
Carved in Stone (Vince Neil album)

See also
Carved into Stone, an album by Prong